Local elections was held in Malabon on May 9, 2022 within the Philippine general election. The voters will elect for the elective local posts in the city: the mayor, vice mayor, the two Congressmen, and the twelve councilors for the city's two Sangguniang Panglungsod districts, six for each district.

Background 
Incumbent Mayor Antolin Oreta III is on his third and final term, and illegible to run for re-election. His party nominated his younger brother, incumbent Second District Councilor Jose Lorenzo "Enzo" Oreta. Oreta will be challenged by former Vice Mayor Jeannie Ng-Sandoval.

Incumbent Vice Mayor Bernard "Ninong" Dela Cruz will seek for his second term. He will be challenged by former councilor, vice mayor and later DSWD Undersecretary Mark Allan Jay "Jayjay" Yambao, sister of incumbent Councilor Maria Anna Lizza "Leslie" Yambao.

Incumbent Representative Josephine Veronique "Jaye" Lacson-Noel will seek for her second term. She will be challenged by former Rep. Federico Sandoval II for the second time. Lacson-Noel ended the term of Sandoval in 2019.

Candidates

Administration coalition

Primary opposition coalition

Independents

Results

For Mayor 
Incumbent Mayor Antolin "Lenlen" Oreta III is on his third and final term, and illegible to run for re-election. His party, the Liberal Party, did not nominate any candidate, but endorsed the candidacy of his younger brother, incumbent Second District Councilor Jose Lorenzo "Enzo" Oreta, under the National Unity Party.

Jose Lorenzo "Enzo" Oreta was defeated by former Vice Mayor Jeannie Ng-Sandoval by a thin margin.

For Vice Mayor 
Incumbent Vice Mayor Bernard "Ninong" Dela Cruz won his second term against former DSWD Undersecretary Mark Allan Jay "Jayjay" Yambao, brother of incumbent Councilor Maria Anna Lizza "Leslie" Yambao.

For District Representative 
Incumbent Representative Josephine Veronique "Jaye" Lacson-Noel also won a second term in her rematch with former Rep. Federico Sandoval II from 2019.

For Councilor

First District 

|-
| colspan="5" style="background:black;"|

Second District 

|-
| colspan="5" style="background:black;"|

References 

2022 Philippine local elections
Elections in Malabon
May 2022 events in the Philippines
2022 elections in Metro Manila